Peter Ottosson (born 4 September 1965) is a Swedish ice hockey player. He competed in the men's tournament at the 1992 Winter Olympics.

Career statistics

Regular season and playoffs

International

References

External links
 

1965 births
Living people
Swedish ice hockey players
Olympic ice hockey players of Sweden
Ice hockey players at the 1992 Winter Olympics
Sportspeople from Västra Götaland County
Färjestad BK players
EHC Kloten players